David Earl Clark (born September 3, 1962) is an American former outfielder in Major League Baseball who played from 1986 to 1998. He most recently served as the first base coach and outfield instructor for the Detroit Tigers. He served as manager of the Houston Astros Double-A affiliate, the Corpus Christi Hooks (2005–2007), and led them to the Texas League Championship in 2006.  He also served as the manager of the Houston Astros' Pacific Coast League Triple-A affiliate, the Round Rock Express and served as the manager for the Huntsville Stars, the double-A affiliate for the Milwaukee Brewers. He was the interim Manager for the Houston Astros at the end of the 2009 season.

Early life
Clark was born in Tupelo, Mississippi, and attended  Jackson State University, where he was team MVP in 1982 and 1983.

Baseball career
Clark was a first round draft pick for the Cleveland Indians in 1983, and made his Major League debut with the club as a September call up in 1986. For his career, Clark batted .264 with 62 home runs and 284 runs batted in over twelve plus seasons. His best season was with the Pittsburgh Pirates in 1994, when he batted .296 with 10 home runs and 46 RBIs.

Clark's first coaching job was within the Pirates organization in 2000. Originally hired as the hitting coach for their rookie club in the Gulf Coast League, by the end of the season he found himself holding the same job with their Triple-A affiliate, the Nashville Sounds. A season later, he was the hitting coach for the Pirates at the major league level.

After two years as the Pirates hitting coach, Clark was offered the managerial position with their advanced A affiliate, the Lynchburg Hillcats. After leading the Hillcats to the Carolina League playoffs, he moved on to the Hickory Crawdads the following season, and lead the team to a South Atlantic League championship.

In 2005, the opportunity to manage at the double-A level lured him away to the Houston Astros organization. In three seasons managing the Corpus Christi Hooks, Clark produced a 207–212 record, and in 2006, led the team to its first ever Texas League Championship.

On September 21, 2009, Clark took over as an interim manager of the Houston Astros, replacing Cecil Cooper.

Clark served as the first base coach for the Astros through the 2013 season and head coach for the Tigres del Licey of the Dominican Winter League.

On November 6, 2013, the Tigers announced the hiring of Clark as third-base coach and outfield instructor. Clark shifted to first base coach prior to the 2020 season.

Managerial record

Personal life
His brother, Louis, was a wide receiver for the Seattle Seahawks.

References

Sources
, or Retrosheet, or Pura Pelota (Venezuelan Winter League)

1962 births
Living people
African-American baseball coaches
African-American baseball players
Albuquerque Dukes players
Baseball players from Mississippi
Buffalo Bisons (minor league) players
Chicago Cubs players
Cleveland Indians players
Colorado Springs Sky Sox players
Detroit Tigers coaches
Houston Astros coaches
Houston Astros managers
Houston Astros players
Jackson State Tigers baseball players
Jackson State University alumni
Kansas City Royals players
Los Angeles Dodgers players
Maine Guides players
Major League Baseball first base coaches
Major League Baseball third base coaches
Major League Baseball hitting coaches
Major League Baseball left fielders
Major League Baseball right fielders
Minor league baseball coaches
Minor league baseball managers
Omaha Royals players
Sportspeople from Tupelo, Mississippi
Pittsburgh Pirates coaches
Pittsburgh Pirates players
Tigres de Aragua players
American expatriate baseball players in Venezuela
Waterbury Indians players
Waterloo Indians players
21st-century African-American people
20th-century African-American sportspeople